Gerald L. Chan (born 1950/1951) is an American billionaire and the brother of fellow billionaire Ronnie Chan. They run the Hang Lung Group.

Early life and education
Gerald Chan is the son of T.H. Chan. 

He received a bachelor of science and a master of science from the University of California, Los Angeles. He then received a master of science in medical radiological physics and a doctor of science in radiation biology from Harvard University. 

In the 1970s, he became a US citizen.

Career
In 1987, he co-founded Morningside Group, a private equity and venture capital group.

He is a director of Hang Lung Group, Stealth Peptides, Advanced Cell Diagnostics, Matrivax, Vaccine Technologies Inc, and Oxyrane. He is also the Chairman and founding investor of Apellis Pharmaceuticals, Inc. (Nasdaq:$APLS)

When his family donated the Harvard School of Public Health $350 million in six annual installments, the largest gift in Harvard's history at the time, the school was renamed the Harvard T.H. Chan School of Public Health for Chan's late father.

As of 2015, he had invested over $100 million in the Harvard Square district of Cambridge.

In September 2018, Chan opened luxury countryside hotel, Heckfield Place, in Hampshire, England, a renovated 18th-century manor house and farm.

In September 2021, the Chans' Morningside Foundation donated $175 million to Umass Medical Center in Worcester, MA, and it changed its name to UMass Chan Medical School.

In March 2022, the Morningside Foundation donated $100 million to found the MIT Morningside Academy for Design, intended to "encourage design work at MIT to grow and cross disciplines among engineering, science, management, computing, architecture, urban planning, and the arts."

Personal life
Chan is married to Beryl, and they have two sons, Ashley being the eldest.

References

Living people
American billionaires
Hong Kong billionaires
University of California, Los Angeles alumni
1950s births
American philanthropists
Hong Kong philanthropists
Harvard School of Public Health alumni
American people of Chinese descent
20th-century American businesspeople
21st-century American businesspeople